Waimakariri United is a football club based in Rangiora, New Zealand. It was formed in 2008 through the merger of two North Canterbury teams, Kaiapoi Town (formerly based at Kendall Park, Kaiapoi) and Rangiora FC (formerly based at Maria Andrews Park, Rangiora).

External links
Official website
New Zealand 2004/05 Season Results

Association football clubs in New Zealand
Sport in Canterbury, New Zealand
2008 establishments in New Zealand
Rangiora